"Summer Girls" is a song by American pop group LFO. It was released on June 29, 1999, as the lead single from their debut album, LFO (1999). The song peaked at number three on the U.S. Billboard 100 the week of August 28, 1999.

"Summer Girls" was certified platinum by the Recording Industry Association of America (RIAA) and reached number one on the Billboard Hot Singles Sales chart in 1999. In 2010, Billboard magazine named it the 14th biggest summer song of all time. In 2019, Billboard also ranked the song the 43rd greatest song of 1999.

Background and content
The song was written by Rich Cronin, Dow Brain, and Brad Young.Cronin said the song included numerous inside jokes, and that he never anticipated its success. He claimed this was because the song was made strictly for a demo tape, but was leaked to WWZZ, a top 40 radio station in Washington, D.C. PD Dale O'Brien at the radio station got an unmixed copy of the song from Kelly Schweinsberg, GM of LFO's initial label, Logic Records. He listened to it a few days later, his "jaw dropped, and the song was added in a hot second." Many of the song's rhyming lines appear to be randomly inserted. The formula often consists of writing a line about Cronin's summer relationship with a girl and following it with a non sequitur that rhymes, similar in fashion to "The Thanksgiving Song" by Adam Sandler. It is considered the most popular song by the boy band.

"Summer Girls" is often identified by one of the lines in the chorus: "I like girls that wear Abercrombie and Fitch" and "You look like a girl from Abercrombie and Fitch." The song was also featured in the 2002 movie Longshot, in which LFO appeared.

The song has myriad, primarily 1980s and early 1990s, cultural references, including Cherry Coke, Macaulay Culkin in Home Alone, Michael J. Fox, his Family Ties character Alex P. Keaton, New Edition, Kevin Bacon in Footloose, New Kids on the Block, Beastie Boys "The New Style", Larry Bird, Abercrombie and Fitch, Cherry Pez, Mr. Limpet, Paul Revere, Chinese food, pogo sticks, Eric B. and Rakim, "Candy Girl", The Color Purple, Boogaloo Shrimp, and Fun Dip. The song also references The Wizard of Oz and Shakespeare's sonnets.

Music video
The music video was directed by Marcus Raboy and was released on July 20, 1999. It was filmed at Coney Island in New York.

Track listings

US CD and cassette single, Australian CD single
 "Summer Girls" – 4:17
 "Summer Girls" (instrumental) – 4:17
 "Can't Have You" – 4:02

European CD single
 "Summer Girls" – 4:17
 "Summer Girls" (instrumental) – 4:17

UK cassette single
 "Summer Girls" – 4:17
 "Can't Have You" – 4:02

UK CD1
 "Summer Girls" – 4:17
 "Summer Girls" (instrumental) – 4:17
 "Summer Girls" (video) – 4:17

UK CD2
 "Summer Girls" – 4:17
 "Can't Have You" – 4:02
 "Summer Girls" (instrumental) – 4:17

Charts and certifications

Weekly charts

Year-end charts

Certifications

|}

Release history

In popular culture
 Rapper Eminem parodied the song's chorus in his track "Marshall Mathers", from his 2000 album The Marshall Mathers LP.

References

External links
 How "Summer Girls" Explains a Bunch of Hits—and the Music of 1999

1999 singles
LFO (American band) songs
Songs written by Rich Cronin
Music videos directed by Marcus Raboy
Abercrombie & Fitch
Arista Records singles
List songs
1998 songs